Comesperma integerrimum  is a twining shrub or climber in the family Polygalaceae. 

The species was first formally described as Comesperma integerrima by the botanist Stephan Endlicher in Enumeratio plantarum quas in Novae Hollandiae ora austro-occidentali ad fluvium Cygnorum et in sinu Regis Georgii collegit Carolus Liber Baro de Hügel in 1837, from a specimen collected by Charles von Hügel at King George Sound (Western Australia).

The species occurs in the states of  New South Wales and Western Australia.

Description 
Comesperma integerrimum is a climber growing from 30 cm to 8 m high, with sparsely branched, ridged stems with appressed hairs between the ridges. The stems are 1 to 2 m long. The leaves are thick and oblanceolate. The inflorescences are terminal on short side branches on stalks abouot 3.5 mm long. The flowers are greenish-yellow. The lateral petals are spoon-like, and the keel is pouched with two lateral lobes.

References

External links
Comesperma integerrimum occurrence data from the Australasian Virtual Herbarium

integerrimum

Flora of New South Wales
Flora of Western Australia
Plants described in 1837
Taxa named by Stephan Endlicher